Yar Hussain is one of the largest towns in the Khyber Pakhtunkhwa province of Pakistan, lying about  from the district capital of Mardan and  from the provincial capital of Peshawar.

Yar Hussain is the business centre of the surrounding locality, which includes the towns of Yaqubi, Sard Chena, Ghazikot, Sadri Jadeed, Urmel Dehri, Sadri Qadeem, Sano Banda, Naiknam, Jagganat, Payende and Dobian. It is also a major tobacco business centre. The tobacco produced is of a good quality. However, the rate of return for the farmers is much lower, as compared to the profit margin for middlemen, companies and cigarette manufacturers.

Yarhussain weather in summer reach to 44°c and winter it down to 1°c which considered that yarhussain lies in almost in area that face extreme weather.

References

Populated places in Swabi District
Yarhussain is the largest populated village of tehsil razar district swabi it a distance of 24 kilometer from mardan and 95 kilometer from Peshawar 
yarhussain is a business center with locality of yaqubai dobian sardcheena bazargai 
 
sardcheena is a distance of 2 kilometer from yarhussain The total population of sardcheena is approximately 400,00 as per the 2020 census.